Keith Burns may refer to:

Sportspeople
Keith Burns (American football coach) (born 1960), American college football coach
Keith Burns (Australian footballer) (born 1939), former Australian rules footballer
Keith Burns (linebacker) (born 1972), former professional American football player and coach

Others
Keith Burns (comics), British comics artist who has worked for the small press and on The Boys
Keith Burns, American guitarist with Trick Pony
Keith Burns, Scottish multi-instrumentalist with Political Asylum and others